Misono Kōda (born 1984) is a Japanese singer-songwriter and TV personality.

Misono may also refer to:
 Misono, Mie, a village in Ise, Japan
 Misono Station, a metro station in Sapporo, Japan
 Misono Chūōkōen Station, a railway station in Hamamatsu, Japan
 Mariko Misono, a character in the .hack anime and video games